SLC Agrícola (Schneider Logemann & Cia) is one of the largest Brazilian agricultural producer founded in 1977 by the SLC Group. It focuses on cotton, soybean, and corn. The business is controlled by the Logemann family. It was the first company of its sector (grains and cotton) whose shares were traded in a Stock Exchange. The company operates 16 farms in six Brazilian states, totaling  in the 2014–15, marketing year –  of which were planted with soybean, 98,500 with cotton, 43,400 with corn, and 18,100 with other crops, including coffee, wheat, corn seed, and sugarcane. Its biggest competitor is Vanguarda Agro.

The company headquarters is Santana, Porto Alegre, Rio Grande do Sul, Brazil.

The firm has attracted international attention for its part in the deforestation of the Cerrado region of Brazil.

History

SLC Agricola was founded in 1977 with the acquisition of two farms in the South Region of Brazil in Rio Grande do Sul, where soybeans, corn, and wheat were planted. In the agribusiness for 70 years, SLC Group started as an industry in 1945, in Horizontina, southern Brazil, producing tractors and combines, and creating a joint venture with John Deere in 1979, which lasted for 20 years. In 1980, SLC Agrícola bought the first farm in the cerrado biome: Pamplona Farm in Goiás State.

SLC Group
SLC Group was founded in 1945, in the city of Horizontina, State of Rio Grande do Sul, by three families of German immigrants, among them the families of Balduino Schneider and Frederico Jorge Logemann.

The SLC Group founded the first Brazilian harvester manufacturing industry. It has an over-28-year relationship with John Deere, including a joint venture for manufacturing harvesters and tractors from 1979 to 1999.

In 2007, SLC Agrícola goes public, starting to trade its shares on the Bovespa.

In 2013, it concludes another joint venture with the companies Dois Vales and Mitsui from Japan.

In 2021, the company Terra Santa, located in Mato Grosso, is incorporated for R$753 million. The deal added six farms to SLC Agrícola's units and expanded its production capacity by another 145,000 hectares.

Land distribution
SLC Agrícola holds  of farmable land worth R$2.376 billion. That area is distributed through 16 farms, and each farm name starts with P and has 8 letters. Three of SLC's farms (Planeste, Panorama, and Piratini) are controlled by SLC Agrícola's subsidiary LandCo. Two other farms (Perdizes and Paladino) are farmed by SLC Agricola through a joint venture with Mitsui Co., while Pioneira is farmed in collaboration with Dois Vales Group.

Farms:
 Perdizes –  (joint venture with Mitsui Co.)
 Paiaguás – 
 Planorte – 
 Pamplona – 
 Planalto – 
 Pioneira –  (joint venture with Dois Vales Group)
 Planeste –  (LandCo.)
 Parnaíba – 
 Parnaguá – 
 Paineira – 
 Parceiro – 
 Paladino –  (joint venture with Mitsui Co.)
 Palmares – 
 Panorama –  (LandCo.)
 Piratini –  (LandCo.)

Research units
Each SLC farm is equipped with a research unit, where the main research topics are fertilizing systems; soil handling systems; competition between soy cultivation, cotton cultivation, and corn hybrids; plantation seasons and rehearsals of evaluation of fungicides efficiency, insecticides, and herbicides. There experiments simulate the real land conditions and are conducted scientifically.

Cultivation rotation system
The cultivation rotation systems between soy, cotton, and corn is effectively utilized within all of SLC Agrícola's farms and provides several benefits to the productive system, along with spreading the fixed costs.

The use of this technique helps the farms have better control over infective plants, fewer outbreaks of pests and diseases on the fields, and better usage of the machinery and crew.

Soil management
SLC Agrícola adopted a no-till system with the goal of significantly reducing the levels soil loss, water loss, and nutrients loss. With this system in place, it became possible to reduce the production costs through the reduction of machine operations in the fields and the conservation of soil and nutrients, which consequently reduced the need for heavy and expensive fertilization. The system provides long-term increase in productive potential of the cultivated plantations. The company believes that the sustainability of the productive system mainly depends on the correct management of the soil.

Soy
SLC Agrícola is one of the biggest soy products of Brazil, with plans to plan  in 2013–14. The company culottes soy in the main agricultural regions of Brazil, and its production is commercialized to both national and international markets.

Soy is the main supplier of vegetable protein used to feed humans and animals, and it is also broadly used as raw material for the production of oil and biofuels.

SLC Agrícola integrates the executive committee of Round Table on Responsible Soy Association, committed to making the value of soy more responsible and also to implementing a global system to promote production, processing, distribution, and consumption of responsible soy.

Productivity:
 2013–14: 
 2014–15: 

Deforestation 

SLC Agrícola has come under scrutiny from the environmentalist non-profit organization Global Witness for its practices of large-scale deforestation, particularly in the Cerrado ecosystem of Brazil. Similarly, Chain Reaction Research also found that the firm has deforested much of the Cerrado, estimating that the firm has cleared  for the production of soy. This figure was corroborated by SLC Agrícola, which admitted that it had cleared  in 2020 alone, although the firm insists that said clearing was done legally. Nevertheless, SLC Agrícola denies it is deforesting the Cerrado, instead saying that it is simply removing "vegetation", and that its properties are not located on land with forests. Chain Reaction Research also condemned the firm for a "lack of zero-deforestation commitment".

In addition to criticism from non-profits, the Government Pension Fund of Norway has divested its holdings of SLC Agrícola due to the firm's large-scale deforestation.

References 

Agriculture companies of Brazil
Companies listed on B3 (stock exchange)
Companies based in Rio Grande do Sul
Economy of Porto Alegre
Brazilian companies established in 1977
Agriculture companies established in 1977